= Maple Mountain mine =

Manganese mine in Maine, United States

- Interactive map of Maple Mountain mine
- Location: Maine, United States; 46°23′54″N 68°00′52″W
- Products: Manganese

The Maple Mountain mine is a mine located in the north-east of the United States in Maine. Maple Mountain represents one of the largest manganese reserve in the United States, having estimated reserves of 341 million tonnes of manganese ore grading 9% manganese metal.
